The Nation is an English-language daily newspaper owned by Majid Nizami Trust and based in Lahore, Pakistan. Rameeza Nizami is the Executive Editor of The Nation.  She is the adopted daughter of the renowned Pakistani journalist, the late Majid Nizami (3 April 1928-26 July 2014).
 
It is published from Lahore, Islamabad, Multan and Karachi.

Nawa-i-Waqt Group
Nawa-i-Waqt Group, which was founded in 1940 by Hameed Nizami (3 Oct 1915–22 Feb 1962) and edited by him until his death in 1962. Nawa-i-Waqt newspaper was later led by Chief Editor Majid Nizami and his nephew, Editor Arif Nizami. Nawa-i-Waqt Group also publishes the Nawa-i-Waqt, an Urdu-language daily newspaper, and prints 4 weekly English and Urdu magazines. Waqt News was another Lahore-based, Urdu-language television channel that was part of the Nawa-i-Waqt Group.

References

External links
 Official Website
 Description of The Nation (Pakistan) newspaper and its mission
 Homepage, Nawa-i-Waqt, an Urdu-language daily newspaper
 Homepage Waqt News TV channel of the Nawa-i-Waqt Group

Daily newspapers published in Pakistan
Mass media in Lahore
Publications established in 1986
English-language newspapers published in Pakistan